Greenseas is a brand of shelf-stable fish products owned by the H. J. Heinz Company. They produce a range of popular goods, including tuna, salmon and sardines.

See also
 Canned tuna

References 
 Greenseas Website: http://www.greenseas.com.au
 Sinopacific Shipbuilding Group Website: https://web.archive.org/web/20120310221659/http://www.sinopacificshipbuilding.com/en/

Heinz brands
Seafood companies of the United States
Canned food
Fish processing companies